Cadbury Dream Factory is a New Zealand reality television where viewers submitted their 'dreams'.
The first episode aired on 20 February 2014 on TV3. The show is presented and hosted by Brooke Howard-Smith and includes his 'helpers', actress Kimberley Crossman, former Sticky TV children's host Walter Neilands, performer Guy Montgomery and stand-up comedian Jesse Griffin.

References

External links
 http://www.tv3.co.nz/Shows/CadburyDreamFactory.aspx

2014 New Zealand television series debuts
2014 New Zealand television series endings
English-language television shows
New Zealand reality television series
Three (TV channel) original programming